WFB is an initialism and may refer to:

Warhammer Fantasy Battles, a table top wargame
Wells Fargo Bank, an American bank
WestfalenBahn, a commuter rail service in Germany
Whitefish Bay, Wisconsin,  a village in Milwaukee County in the U.S. state of Wisconsin. 
Wilhelm Friedemann Bach (1710–1784), eldest son of Johann Sebastian Bach (JSB)
William F. Buckley Jr., an American conservative author and commentator
The Washington Free Beacon, an American online newspaper
The World Factbook, a publication of the United States' Central Intelligence Agency
World Fellowship of Buddhists
World Fire Brigade, an American rock band consisting of Sean Danielsen and Brett Scallions

Initialisms